Nobol (also known as Narcisa de Jesús) is a town located in central Guayas, Ecuador. It is the seat of Nobol Canton, created in 1992.

As of the census of 2001, there are 14,753 people residing within the canton limits. The town is situated about 38.5 kilometres (24 mi) north of Guayaquil. Nobol was the birthplace of Narcisa de Jesús, who was canonized by Pope Benedict XVI on October 12, 2008, and the Santuario de Santa Narcisa de Jesus Martillo y Morán located in the town center was dedicated to her on August 22, 1998.

External links

 www.inec.gov.ec

Populated places in Guayas Province